The Military Operations Research Society (MORS) is a society for professionals active within defense applications of operations research (OR) in the United States. Memberships include analysts, researchers, consultants and officers in the United States Department of Defense, organizations within the military of the United States, various think tanks, academic institutions and consultancy firms.

The Military Operations Research Society arranges symposia and courses, and publishes books, a quarterly bulletin called Phalanx, and a peer reviewed journal called Military Operations Research. Participation in MORS activities generally requires a United States security clearance. MORS is headquartered in Alexandria, Virginia.

The MORS has served the Department of Defense analytic community for over forty years and now also includes other aspects of national security for the United States federal government. Under the sponsorship of the Army, Navy, Air Force, Marine Corps, Office of the Secretary of Defense, the Joint Staff and the Department of Homeland Security, the objective of MORS is to enhance the quality and effectiveness of operations research as applied to national security issues.

MORS vision is to "become the recognized leader in advancing the national security analytic community through the advancement and application of the interdisciplinary field of Operations Research to national security issues, being responsive to our constituents, enabling collaboration and development opportunities, and expanding our membership and disciplines, while maintaining our profession’s heritage." This vision encompasses all aspects of national security including not only the military, but also Homeland Security and the other agencies of government – including the US and its allies.

Members of the Society include a cross section of the defense analysts, operators and managers from government, industry and academia. Their involvement fosters professional interchange within the military operations research community, the sharing of insights and information on challenging national security issues and specific support to decision makers in the many organizations and agencies that address national defense. MORS provides an array of meetings and publications. In particular, the Society provides a unique environment in which classified presentations and discussions can take place with joint service participation and peer criticism from the full range of students, theoreticians, practitioners and users of military analysis. Throughout its activities, the Society promotes professional methodology, individual excellence and ethical conduct.

History
Before and during World War II, OR was an area of military analysis, so original membership of the Operations Research Society of America (ORSA), founded in 1952, included many practitioners within military OR. Gradually, the scope of ORSA became wider, but still includes a Military Applications Society.

In August 1957, the first Military Operations Research Symposium ("MORS") was held in California under the sponsorship of the Office of Naval Research in Pasadena and initially were gatherings of the military OR community on the west coast of the United States.

In 1962 these symposia had become national and joint in focus. In April 1966, the Military Operations Research Society was incorporated in order to handle these symposia, and in 1989 MORS was adopted as the acronym of the society while the symposia were called MORSS.

The First Military Operations Research Symposium (MORS), sponsored by the Office of Naval Research (ONR) – Pasadena, was held at Corona Naval Ordnance Lab, Corona, California in August 1957. The subject was Air Defense; 83 scientists attended. This and subsequent early meetings were oriented to fulfill the needs of the Operations Research Community on the West Coast. Starting with the Eighth MORS the Symposia became nationally oriented, joint-service meetings. The first national Symposium was the Ninth MORS held at Fort Monroe, Virginia in April 1962. From the First through the 10th MORS there was no formal organization to stage the meetings. They were conducted by ONR – Pasadena with the help of a volunteer steering committee.

Beginning with the 11th MORS, ONR – Washington assumed their supervision and hired a contractor to perform the work in cooperation with a volunteer executive committee. This arrangement continued until April 1966 at which time the Military Operations Research Society was incorporated. In 1989, the symposia became the Military Operations Research Society Symposia (MORSS) and MORS became the acronym for the Society.

During its over forty years, MORS has expanded its services. In addition to conducting the classified Symposium, MORS holds several other special meetings and workshop annually. The Society also publishes abstracts, monographs, brochures, a quarterly bulletin – PHALANX and a refereed journal – Military Operations Research, for professional exchange and peer criticism among students, theoreticians, practitioners and users of military operations research.

Since its incorporation in 1966, MORS has been led by a Board of Directors.  This consists of 28 voting members and two non-voting members – the Chief Executive Officer and the Immediate Past President.  The Board is also led by an Executive Council consisting of The President, the President-Elect, the Immediate Past President, the Vice President for Financial Management, the Vice President for Societal Services, the Vice President for Member Services, the Secretary of the Society and the Chief Executive Officer.

MORS also makes unclassified documents and information available. The Military Operations Research Society is a professional Society incorporated under the laws of Virginia. The Society does not make or advocate official policy nor does it attempt to influence the formulation of policy. Matters discussed or statements made in the course of MORS symposia or printed in its publications represent the opinions of the authors and not of the Society.

Military Operations Research Society Symposium

See also
I/ITSEC
Journal of the Military Operations Research Society of Korea
Simulation Interoperability Standards Organization

References

External links
MORS website
MORS Completed Events

Operations research societies
United States Department of Defense
Military simulation